Getting Even is a 1993 rock album released by guitarist Greg Ginn on Cruz Records, his first full-length solo album. Ginn had taken time to establish his solo career after the breakup of Black Flag. Very different from his work with other bands such as Gone, Getting Even consists of jam-oriented, punk-blues material. Most of the songs barely last two minutes which has come to be uncommon amongst his other musical projects, but still is given attention with a positive light.

Track listing
"I've Changed" – 1:25
"Kill Burn Fluff" – 2:04
"You Drive Me Crazy" – 3:40
"Pig MF" – 1:33
"Hard Thing" – 3:05
"Payday" – 1:24
"Nightmares" – 2:37
"Torn" – 2:26
"PF Flyer" – 1:18
"I Can't Wait" - 2:31
"Short Fuse" - 1:58
"Not That Simple" - 1:30
"Yes Officer" - 2:25
"Crawling Inside" - 3:06

Personnel
Greg Ginn - guitar, bass guitar, vocals, producer
David Raven - drums
Technical
Steve Fisk - engineer
Andy Batwinas - engineer, mixing
John Golden - mastering

1993 debut albums